BlueLinx Holdings (NYSE: BXC) is a wholesale distributor of building and industrial products in the United States. Headquartered in Atlanta, Georgia, Dwight A. Gibson serves as its President, CEO and Director.

BlueLinx was formed in May 2004, when senior management purchased the assets of the distribution division from Georgia-Pacific. Cerberus Capital Management provided the equity financing and became majority owner.

The distribution division of Georgia-Pacific Corporation began operations in 1954 with 13 warehouses used for storage and distribution of Georgia-Pacific plywood. Over the next 40 years, the division grew to over 130 warehouses nationwide, offering a wide range of products. In 1994, the division consolidated its warehouses and created two large sales and operations centers in Denver, Colorado and Atlanta, Georgia for the purposes of operational efficiency.

BlueLinx completed its initial public offering on the New York Stock Exchange on December 14, 2004.

On October 18, 2017, BlueLinx Holdings Inc., Cerberus Capital Management, and BTIG as underwriter, entered into an underwriting agreement. Cerberus sold 3,863,850 shares, or about 49% of the company’s common stock at a price of $7.00 per share.

On March 9, 2018, BlueLinx entered into a planned merger agreement to buy Cedar Creek Holdings from Charlesbank Equity. The merger closed on April 13, 2018.

The company's operations now consist of a network of over 60 distribution centers located throughout the U.S.

References

External links
 
 BlueLinx SEC filings

Companies listed on the New York Stock Exchange
Wholesalers of the United States
Forest products companies of the United States
Building materials companies of the United States
Companies based in Atlanta
2004 initial public offerings
American companies established in 2004
2004 establishments in Georgia (U.S. state)
Georgia-Pacific